Chibougamau/Chapais Airport  is located  southwest of Chibougamau, Quebec, Canada, or about halfway to Chapais along Route 113.

Airlines and destinations

Incidents
On October 25, 2007 at approximately 0900 local time, a Beech King Air 100A operating as "Cree" 501 crashed on approach into Chibougamau (CYMT). Both pilots were fatally injured. No passengers were on board. It was speculated that the cause of the accident was the visibility at the airport, which was 1.5SM with a ceiling of 500 feet.

References

External links
Page about this airport on COPA's Places to Fly airport directory

Certified airports in Nord-du-Québec
Chibougamau
Eeyou Istchee (territory)